Inversodicraea are a genus of flowering plants in the family Podostemaceae, found in Africa. They are confined to areas that receive a spray of water from waterfalls, and some species are confined to a single waterfall.

Species
Currently accepted species include:
Inversodicraea abbayesii G.Taylor
Inversodicraea achoundongii J.J.Schenk, Herschlag & D.W.Thomas
Inversodicraea adamesii G.Taylor
Inversodicraea annithomae (C.Cusset) Rutish. & Thiv
Inversodicraea boumiensis (C.Cusset) Cheek
Inversodicraea congolana Hauman
Inversodicraea cristata Engl.
Inversodicraea cussetiana (Cheek & Ameka) Cheek
Inversodicraea digitata H.E.Hess
Inversodicraea ebo Cheek
Inversodicraea eladii Cheek
Inversodicraea feika Cheek
Inversodicraea fluitans H.E.Hess
Inversodicraea gabonensis (C.Cusset) Cheek
Inversodicraea harrisii (C.Cusset) Cheek
Inversodicraea kamerunensis (Engl.) Engl.
Inversodicraea koukoutamba Cheek
Inversodicraea ledermannii (Engl.) Engl.
Inversodicraea liberia Cheek
Inversodicraea mortonii (C.Cusset) Cheek
Inversodicraea ntemensis (Y.Kita, Koi, Rutish. & M.Kato) J.J.Schenk, Herschlag & D.W.Thomas
Inversodicraea paulsitae (C.Cusset) Cheek
Inversodicraea pepehabae Cheek
Inversodicraea pygmaea G.Taylor
Inversodicraea tassing Cheek
Inversodicraea tchoutoi Cheek
Inversodicraea tenax (C.H.Wright) Engl. ex R.E.Fr.
Inversodicraea thollonii (Baill.) Cheek
Inversodicraea torrei (C.Cusset) Cheek
Inversodicraea warmingiana (Gilg) Engl.
Inversodicraea xanderi Cheek

References

Podostemaceae
Malpighiales genera